The Golden Idol is a 1954 American adventure film directed by Ford Beebe and starring Johnny Sheffield, Anne Kimbell and Paul Guilfoyle. It was the tenth in the 12-film Bomba, the Jungle Boy series. It was produced and distributed by Allied Artists

Plot
Prince Ali wants the Golden Idol of Watusi and hires a ruthless hunter to get it for him. Bomba has the idol and, with the help of Commissioner Barnes, Eli, and a beautiful archaeologist from the British Museum (Anne Kimbell), he foils Ali's plans. Ali and the hunter are noticeably more cold-blooded than most of Bomba's adversaries.

Cast
 Johnny Sheffield as Bomba
 Anne Kimbell as Karen Marsh
 Paul Guilfoyle as Ali Ben Mamoud
 Leonard Mudie as Commissioner Andy Barnes
 Smoki Whitfield as Eli
 Rick Vallin as Abdullah
 Lane Bradford as Joe Hawkins

References

External links

1954 films
American adventure films
Films directed by Ford Beebe
Monogram Pictures films
1950s English-language films
1954 adventure films
American black-and-white films
1950s American films